Lab Sefid-e Sofla (also Romanized as Lab Sefīd-e Soflá; also known as Lop Sefīd-e Soflá) is a village in Sardasht Rural District, Sardasht District, Dezful County, Khuzestan Province, Iran. At the 2006 census, its population was 43, in 8 families.

References 

Populated places in Dezful County